Elachista solitaria is a moth of the family Elachistidae. It is found in the United States, where it has been recorded from Florida, Kentucky and Ohio.

The wingspan is 5-5.5 mm. The forewings are dark brown, with a slight reddish luster and a small silvery gray spot at the base of the costa, as well as a brilliant silvery fascia just before the middle and a narrow silvery spot at the tornus. Beyond this, near the apex, is a larger silvery costal mark. The hindwings are dark brownish gray. Adults have been recorded on wing from June to July.

The larvae feed on Panicum species. They mine the leaves of their host plant. The mine starts as a very narrow gallery with a conspicuous line of frass. Later, the mine is enlarged into a whitish translucent blotch. Mining larvae can be found from the end of May to the end of June.

References

solitaria
Moths described in 1922
Moths of North America